= Vice President of the United Nations =

There are several positions within the United Nations that have the title Vice President:

- Vice President of the United Nations General Assembly
- Vice President of the United Nations Security Council
- Vice President of the United Nations Economic and Social Council
